Cray Valley Paper Mills Football Club is a football club currently based in Eltham, in the Royal Borough of Greenwich, England.

History
The club was established in 1919 and joined Division Two of the Sidcup & Kent League. Playing in green and white, the colours of the mill's vehicles, Their first match was played on 20 September 1919, a 1–0 win against Hamilton House. The club won the division at the first attempt, earning promotion to Division One. They later joined the Kent County Amateur League, winning Division Three of the western section in 1936–37. The club left the league at the end of the 1954–55 season.

Cray Valley subsequently joined the South London Alliance. They were Division One champions in 1979–80 and won the Premier Division two seasons later. The club won Division One again in 1983–84, and finished as runners-up in the Premier Division in 1988–89. In 1991 they joined Division One of the Spartan League. When it merged with the South Midlands League to form the Spartan South Midlands League in 1997, the club were placed in Division One South. Despite finishing as runners-up in the league's first season, they left to become founder members of the London Intermediate League. However, in 2001 they left to rejoin the Kent County League, becoming members of Division One West.

In 2002–03 Cray Valley won Division One West, earning promotion to the Premier Division. Two seasons later they won the Premier Division. After finishing third in 2010–11, they moved up to the Kent League, which was renamed the Southern Counties East League in 2013. When the league gained a second division in 2016, the club became members of the Premier Division. In 2016–17 they won the London Senior Cup, beating Metropolitan Police 2–1 in the final, becoming the lowest-ranked team to ever win the trophy. They were also runners-up in the Kent Reliance Senior Trophy in the same season. However they were disqualified from the first round of the FA Vase for fielding an ineligible player, former Crystal Palace defender Matthew Parsons. The club reached the London Senior Cup final again the following season, but lost 4–1 to Balham.

The 2018–19 season saw Cray reach the FA Vase final for the first time, in which they lost 3–1 after extra time to Chertsey Town at Wembley Stadium. They were also Southern Counties East League Premier Division champions, earning promotion to the South East Division of the Isthmian League. In 2020–21 the club reached the first round of the FA Cup for the first time, losing 1–0 at Havant & Waterlooville.

Ground
The club originally played at the sports ground of the paper mills in St Paul's Cray. However, the mills closed in 1981 and the club then played at numerous grounds until moving permanently to the Badgers Sports Ground in Eltham. In 2016 Greenwich Borough agreed a 30-year lease to share the ground. The ground includes a 100-seat stand on one side of the pitch and a small covered area on the other.

Honours
Southern Counties East League
Premier Division champions 2018–19
Kent County League
Premier Division champions 2004–05
Division One West champions 2002–03
Division Three (Western Section) champions 1933–37
South London Alliance
Premier Division winners 1980–81
Division One champions 1979–80, 1983–84
Sidcup & Kent League
Division Two champions 1919–20
London Senior Cup
Winners 2016–17
London Intermediate Cup
Winners 2002–03, 2003–04, 2009–10
Kent Intermediate Shield
Winners 2004–05
Kent Junior Cup 
Winners 1921–22, 1977–78, 1980–81

Records
Best FA Cup performance: First round, 2020–21
Best FA Trophy performance: Third qualifying round, 2022–23
Best FA Vase performance: Runners-up, 2018–19
Record attendance: 663 vs Canterbury City, FA Vase semi-final, 17 March 2019

See also
Cray Valley Paper Mills F.C. players

References

External links
Official website

Football clubs in England
Football clubs in London
Association football clubs established in 1919
1919 establishments in England
Kent County League
South London Football Alliance
Spartan League
Spartan South Midlands Football League
Southern Counties East Football League
Isthmian League
Sport in the Royal Borough of Greenwich
Works association football teams in England